Cekanowo may refer to the following places in Poland:

 Cekanowo, Gmina Bielsk
 Cekanowo, Gmina Słupno